Elliottstown is an unincorporated community in Lucas township, Effingham County, Illinois, United States.

Elliottstown is located at the juncture of E 600th Avenue and N 1900th Street, and the nearby juncture of E 600th Avenue and 1775th Road. It is in Effingham County. Elliottstown (often misspelled as “Elliotstown”) is in Dieterich Unit 30 school district. It is now little more than a cluster of houses. There was once a school in the town, but its building is now privately owned. A church building is also present and is privately owned, now used as a residential building.

References 

Unincorporated communities in Effingham County, Illinois
Unincorporated communities in Illinois